Riders of Border Bay is a 1925 American silent film directed by Denver Dixon, and starring Art Mix. It premiered on February 16, 1925, in Indianapolis, Indiana.

References

American silent films
American black-and-white films
Films directed by Victor Adamson